New Salem United Methodist Church is a historic United Methodist church on Tipton Station Road in Knoxville, Tennessee.

It was built in 1898 and added to the National Register of Historic Places in 1983.

In 2013, Knox Heritage gave the church a "Fantastic Fifteen" award in recognition of historic stewardship.

References

External links
 New Salem UMC, Holston Conference of the United Methodist Church

United Methodist churches in Tennessee
Churches on the National Register of Historic Places in Tennessee
Carpenter Gothic church buildings in Tennessee
Churches completed in 1898
19th-century Methodist church buildings in the United States
Churches in Knoxville, Tennessee
1898 establishments in Tennessee
National Register of Historic Places in Knoxville, Tennessee